The 1985 Florida State Seminoles football team represented Florida State University in the 1985 NCAA Division I-A football season.

The Seminoles offense scored 402 points while the defense allowed 258 points. Florida State competed in the Gator Bowl.

Schedule

Roster

Rankings

Game summaries

at Nebraska

Miami (FL)

at Florida

Team players in the NFL
The following were selected in the 1986 NFL Draft.

References

External links
 1985 Media Guide

Florida State
Florida State Seminoles football seasons
Gator Bowl champion seasons
Florida State Seminoles football